Anost is a commune in the Saône-et-Loire department in the Bourgogne-Franche-Comté region in eastern France.

Geography
The commune lies in the northeast of the department near Autun in the area of the Morvan.

Population

See also
Communes of the Saône-et-Loire department
Parc naturel régional du Morvan

References

External links
Official website

Communes of Saône-et-Loire